The 1989 FIVB Volleyball Boys' U19 World Championship was held in Dubai, United Arab Emirates for nine days, from 30 December 1989 to 7 January 1990. This was the first edition of the tournament.



Competition formula
The 12 teams were divided into two pools of six teams each and played a round-robin tournament. The top two teams of each pool progressed to the semifinals.

Pools composition

Preliminary round

Pool A

|}

|}

Pool B

|}

|}

Final round

1st–4th places

Semifinals

|}

3rd place match

|}

Final

|}

Final standing

See also
1989 FIVB Girls' U18 World Championship

References

External links
Results

FIVB Volleyball Boys' U19 World Championship
Volleyball
Sports competitions in Dubai
1989 in Emirati sport